Zinc finger and BTB domain containing 48 (ZBTB48), also known as telomeric zinc-finger associated protein (TZAP), is a protein that directly binds to the double-stranded repeat sequence of telomeres. In humans it is encoded by the ZBTB48 gene.

Loss of ZBTB48 has been shown to lead to telomere elongation both in cells with long and short telomeres. In addition, overexpression of ZBTB48 in cancer cells maintaining their telomeres based on the Alternative Lengthening of Telomeres (ALT) mechanism leads to trimming of telomeres. Beyond its telomeric function, ZBTB48 acts as a transcriptional activator on a small set of target genes, including mitochondrial fission process 1 (MTFP1) and CDKN2A. ZBTB48 localizes to chromosome 1p36, a region that is frequently rearranged (leiomyoma & leukaemia) or deleted (neuroblastoma, melanoma, Merkel cell carcinoma, pheochromocytoma, and carcinomas of colon and breast) in different human cancers and therefore might be a putative tumour suppressor, but not without dispute.

References

Further reading 

 
 
 
 

Genes on human chromosome 1
Telomeres
Transcription factors